A strategy game or strategic game is a game (e.g. a board game) in which the players' uncoerced, and often autonomous, decision-making skills have a high significance in determining the outcome. Almost all strategy games require internal decision tree-style thinking, and typically very high situational awareness.

Strategy games are also seen as a descendant of war games, and define strategy in terms of the context of war, but this is more partial. A strategy game is a game that relies primarily on strategy, and when it comes to defining what strategy is, two factors need to be taken into account: its complexity and game-scale actions, such as each placement in a Total War series. The definition of a strategy game in its cultural context should be any game that belongs to a tradition that goes back to war games, contains more strategy than the average video game, contains certain gameplay conventions, and is represented by a particular community. Although war is dominant in strategy games, it is not the whole story.

History
The history of turn-based strategy games goes back to the times of ancient civilizations found in places such as Rome, Greece, Egypt, the Levant, and India. Many were played widely through their regions of origin, but only some are still played today. One such game is mancala, which may have originated in Samaria approximately 5000 years ago and has since diversified into scores of varieties worldwide. One form challenges two opposing players to clear their side of a board of mancala pieces while adding them into their opponent's side and thereby preventing the opponent from clearing their side. At each end of the game board in this version there is a larger pit in which each player must try to deposit the pieces to try to gain points. When one side is cleared the other side of the board's pieces are added to the cleared side's pile. This version of mancala can be played quite casually, but still presents strategy demands, e.g. to interfere in the opponent's playing area while clearing one's own.

Another game that has stood the test of time is chess, believed to have originated in India around the sixth century CE. The game spread to the west by trade, but chess gained social status and permanence more strongly than many other games. Chess became a game of skill and tactics often forcing the players to think two or three moves ahead of their opponent just to keep up. This game also became accepted by many as a proxy for intelligence; people who became grand masters were considered smart. The game portrays foot soldiers, knights, kings, queens, bishops, and rooks. Several portray actual positions in the historical European military. Each piece has a unique movement pattern. For example, the knight is constricted to moving in an L-shape two squares long and one square to the side, the rook can only move in a straight line vertically or horizontally, and bishops can move diagonally on the board.

Types

Abstract strategy

In abstract strategy games, the game is only loosely tied to a thematic concept, if at all. The rules do not attempt to simulate reality, but rather serve the internal logic of the game.

A purist's definition of an abstract strategy game requires that it cannot have random elements or hidden information. This definition includes such games as chess and Go. However, many games are commonly classed as abstract strategy games which do not meet these criteria: games such as backgammon, Octiles, Can't Stop, Sequence and Mentalis have all been described as "abstract strategy" games despite having a chance element. A smaller category of non-perfect abstract strategy games incorporate hidden information without using any random elements; for example, Stratego.

Team strategy
One of the most focused team strategy games is contract bridge. This card game consists of two teams of two players, whose offensive and defensive skills are continually in flux as the game's dynamic progresses. Some argue that the benefits of playing this team strategy card game extend to those skills and strategies used in business and that the playing of these games helps to automate strategic awareness.

Eurogames

Eurogames, or German-style boardgames, are a relatively new genre that sit between abstract strategy games and simulation games. They generally have simple rules, short to medium playing times, indirect player interaction and abstract physical components. The games emphasize strategy, play down chance and conflict, lean towards economic rather than military themes, and usually keep all the players in the game until it ends.

Simulation
This type of game is an attempt to simulate the decisions and processes inherent to some real-world situation. Most of the rules are chosen to reflect what the real-world consequences would be of each player's actions and decisions. 
Abstract games cannot be completely divided from simulations and so games can be thought of as existing on a continuum of almost pure abstraction (like Abalone) to almost pure simulation (like Diceball! or Strat-o-Matic Baseball).

Wargame

Wargames are simulations of military battles, campaigns, or entire wars. Players will have to consider situations that are analogous to the situations faced by leaders of historical battles. As such, wargames are usually heavy on simulation elements, and while they are all "strategy games", they can also be "strategic" or "tactical" in the military jargon sense. Its creator, H. G. Wells, stated how "much better is this amiable miniature [war] than the real thing".

Traditionally, wargames have been played either with miniatures, using physical models of detailed terrain and miniature representations of people and equipment to depict the game state; or on a board, which commonly uses cardboard counters on a hex map.

Popular miniature wargames include Warhammer 40,000 or its fantasy counterpart Warhammer Fantasy. Popular strategic board wargames include Risk, Axis and Allies, Diplomacy, and Paths of Glory. Advanced Squad Leader is a successful tactical scale wargame.

It is instructive to compare the Total War series to the Civilization series, where moving troops to a specific tile is a tactic because there are no short-range decisions. But in Empire: Total War (2009), every encounter between two armies activates a real-time mode in which they must fight and the same movement of troops is treated as a strategy. Throughout the game, the movement of each army is at a macro scale, because the player can control each battle at a micro scale. However, as an experience, the two types of military operations are quite similar and involve similar skills and thought processes. The concept of micro scale and macro scale can well describe the gameplay of a game; however, even very similar games can be difficult to integrate into a common vocabulary. In this definition, strategy does not explicitly describe the player's experience; it is more appropriate to describe different formal game components. The similarity of the actions taken in two different games does not affect our definition of them as strategy or tactics: we will only rely on their scale in their respective games.

Strategy video games

Strategy video games are categorized based on whether they offer the continuous gameplay of real-time strategy (RTS), or the discrete phases of turn-based strategy (TBS). Often the computer is expected to emulate a strategically thinking "side" similar to that of a human player (such as directing armies and constructing buildings), or emulate the "instinctive" actions of individual units that would be too tedious for a player to administer (such as for a peasant to run away when attacked, as opposed to standing still until otherwise ordered by the player); hence there is an emphasis on artificial intelligence.

Modern day turn-based
One of today's modern games that has become a sensation for its strategy and tactics is the XCOM franchise, specifically the two most recent games, XCOM: Enemy Unknown (2012) and XCOM 2 (2016). These two games portray the player as a commander of an international organization known as XCOM. The player's job is to repel an alien force using the recourses that you are given by each region and country that is a part of the organization. The game is played through confrontations with the alien force using a squad of four to six soldiers with periods of time in between where the player is able to even the odds placed against them by upgrading weapons and armor for the soldiers using technology that is recovered from the aliens. These upgrades result in boosted health as well as laser- and plasma-based weapons and are necessary to achieve if the player wishes to complete the game. Like chess the games have different classes of soldiers with different abilities which can turn the tide of the game if you use them correctly or not. They come in six classes for each game. In XCOM: Enemy Unknown the soldier classes consist of heavy, capable of dealing heavy damage and carrying rockets as well as grenades; the sniper, capable of hitting enemies from beyond line of sight and doing immense amounts of damage with a single shot; the support, can heal teammates and provide cover using smoke; the assault, which relies on getting up close in order to use the shotgun that they use to make short work of any enemy; the Psionic, this class specializes in applying status effects and generally messing with the opponent's force; and finally the MEC, this used to be a fully organic being but volunteered to replace their organic body with robotic augments, this gives them massive amounts of health and makes them the tanks of the game on the protagonists side.

Another aspect of turn-based strategy rather than just a battlefield in modern video games is controlling countries such as in the Civilization franchise and their most recent title, Civilization VI. This strategy game forces the player to look at the world as a whole as there are multiple countries involved in the game that will react to the player and their actions and how they influence the world. The player must maintain relations with other nations as they try to progress their society forward by the inclusion of funding to sections of their society such as mathematics, art, science, and agriculture. Each of these is important to maintain as the player progresses because without the added funds to these branches of society most players will be stuck in the Dark Ages while other civilizations advance into renaissance eras and further. This can cause turmoil in the player's civilization as well as revolt and will bring the civilization crumbling to the ground. This is only a small portion of the game, the other nations around the player will offer treaties and alliances but some of these are shams and are used to lure the player into a false sense of security as an allied nation begins to take over resources or land that used to belong to the player. In these situations it becomes tricky to navigate as there are two paths, negotiation or war. Negotiations are often the best choice because it avoids conflict and allows your society to progress further whereas war takes a considerable amount of resources and the player must also be aware of the actual allies that the opposing force has and how much aid they will provide. Unfortunately negotiations are not always possible and it can result in war, this makes it very important to have loyal allies of your own and a suitable army with sufficient technologies which is all supported by your societies math and science departments respectively.

See also

Game of chance
Game of skill
Mind sport

References